Oberhausen-Osterfeld Süd station is a railway station in Oberhausen, North Rhine-Westphalia, Germany. It is part of the Oberhausen-Osterfeld complex which includes a large marshalling yard.

The station

The station opened in 1873 and is located on the Oberhausen-Osterfeld Süd – Hamm railway and is served by RB services operated by NordWestBahn.

Train services
The following service currently call at Oberhausen-Osterfeld Süd:

Bus services

 958

Rail depot

The stations lies close to Oberhausen-Osterfeld rail depot and freight yard.

See also

 List of railway stations in North Rhine-Westphalia

References

External links
 Railways in Osterfeld 

Railway stations in North Rhine-Westphalia
Buildings and structures in Oberhausen
Railway stations in Germany opened in 1873